Bob Rogers OAM (born 3 December 1926) is an Australian disc jockey and radio broadcaster. Prior to his retirement in October 2020, he presented the six-hour Saturday evening Reminiscing program on Sydney radio station 2CH and previously presented The Bob Rogers Show on weekday mornings.

Early life
Rogers was born to British parents and raised in Donald, Victoria. His father had been a junior butcher before becoming a farmer. He used to help his father round up the sheep and catch the lambs before slaughter.

Career
Rogers began his career as a panel operator for 3XY in Melbourne in 1942. Moving onto a Hobart station, he worked six days a week as a radio announcer, including presenting racing on Saturdays. Soon, Rogers was given permission to start a Sunday afternoon music program, playing new records given to him by American sailors coming off ships from America. Rogers resigned and started a similar music program on Brisbane's 4BH in 1950. In 1957, Rogers discovered the Slim Dusty song Pub With No Beer and was the first DJ in Australia to play the song and bring it to number one on the charts.

Rogers subsequently presented Australia's first Top 40 show on 2UE from 1958 to 1962. He was Australia's top radio DJ for the next 8 years.

In 1962 he joined 2SM which jumped to number 1. In 1964 Rogers was chosen to represent 2SM on The Beatles' tour through Europe, Asia and Australia. He returned to 2UE and presented his morning radio show with a new format of provocative commentary, gossip and music. His programme became popular amongst interview-hungry artists. In 1976, Rogers wrote Rock And Roll Australia, a book about the birth of the Australian rock industry. In 1982, he started a chain of women's dress shops.

2CH radio
In November 1995, Rogers accepted John Singleton's offer and joined Sydney radio station 2CH. On 21 February 2007, according to the Nielsen radio ratings survey, Bob Rogers' Morning show became the fourth most heard radio programme in Sydney in that particular timeslot by beating John Laws of 2UE into fifth place. It is generally more difficult for an easy listening station in Sydney to achieve a greater audience share than a talkback station. Overall, 2CH has overtaken 2UE to claim sixth place. On 5 December 2007, Rogers was verbally abused with obscenities by long-time professional rival John Laws, in unprovoked circumstances whilst dining at lunch with 3AW personality Derryn Hinch in a Woolloomooloo restaurant.

After suffering a stroke while on air in 2018, Rogers announced in November 2018 that he would stop presenting his morning programme. He continued presenting his Reminiscing program on Saturdays until 3 October 2020, when he finally retired.

Radio career breakdown

References

1926 births
Living people
Australian television personalities
Recipients of the Medal of the Order of Australia
Australian people of British descent
Former 2GB presenters